François Solier (1558 – 16 October 1628) was a French Jesuit, head of the college of Limoges, preacher, translator of spiritual works into French and author of historical books.

Biography 

François Solier was born in Brive in 1558.
He entered the Society of Jesus on 20 August 1577 and took his novitiate in Bordeaux. 
At the end of his spiritual and academic training he was ordained a priest in Paris in 1589. 
From 1591 to 1596 Father Solier was master of novices in Verdun. 
In 1597 he was appointed to Limoges.

Head of the Collège of Limoges 

Father Solier was the first Jesuit rector at the College of Limoges when the management of the College of Limoges was entrusted to the Jesuits in 1598. 
Solier held this position from August 1598 until 1603. 
He again became rector of the College of Limoges from 1606 to 1608.

While François Solier was still negotiating for the college of Limoges to be officially entrusted to the Jesuits, while already being the de facto rector of this establishment, a representation of the tragedy Absalom was performed at the college in July 1599. 
The Jesuit drama was performed by the students of the college, annual theatrical performances being part of the Jesuit pedagogical tradition. 
The crowd of spectators was considerable; the hall, the courtyard, the garden, the walls of the neighboring rampart, and even the roofs of the surrounding houses were black with people.
The bishop with his clergy, consuls, and senior figures of all orders attended this performance.

We find an illustration of the way in which the function of rector could be lived at that time, and also of what could be the experience of the college students of Limoges, from the description of a religious procession which took place in Limoges in 1610, a few years after François Solier had exercised the functions of rector.
As Pierre Delage reports, the Jesuits had recently settled in Limoges in the years 1600–1610, and they were keen to revive the Catholic faith in the city.
To this end, they organized processions, in which the students of the boys' college participated, such as the one that took place in 1610, of which here is a description:

We see here that the sixth grade class, as well as the philosophy class, have not yet been created, and that without these two classes the total number of pupils is 418 college students, while the teachers number seven fathers in 1610, and will number thirty-two in 1622.

Theologian and translator 

François Solier is known for having participated in a religious controversy when he translated into French, in 1611, three Spanish sermons which had been delivered during the beatification of Ignatius of Loyola, founder of the Company of Jesus, by the Fathers Pierre de Valderame, Pierre Deza, Jacques Rebullosa. 
The theological faculty of Paris condemned propositions contained in these texts as "impious, execrable, detestable, false and manifestly heretical".
The Jesuits, through François Solier, responded in 1611 with a letter in which he accused the College of Sorbonne of being more severe than the Inquisition of Spain and of being in touch with the Protestants.

François Solier published many translations from Latin, Spanish and Italian of works of a religious nature, as well as books on subjects of a religious nature.

Historian 

A remarkable work by François Solier is a book of a historical nature that deals with the life of the Catholic Church in Japan at the turn of the sixteenth and seventeenth centuries. 
In this work, “Ecclesiastical History of the Islands and Kingdom of Japan, collected by Father François Solier”, François Solier reports the events which saw Catholics, clerics, or laity, undergo religious persecution, and, for some, such as the Italian Jesuit Charles Spinola, to be put to death in Japan at the beginning of the seventeenth century for having practiced Catholic worship.
Here is how François Solier relates events of religious persecutions in Japan in 1622, in a style that accurately reflects these very dark facts which were reported to the author by witnesses present in Japan during these years of religious persecution,

Death 

François Solier died on October 16, 1638, in Saint-Macaire, Gironde.
He has always been held in great esteem by his order. 
Tireless at work, he found the time, while taking care to run the school for which he was in charge perfectly, to publish quite a number of works.

Writings

Notes

Citations

Sources

1558 births
1628 deaths
16th-century French Jesuits
17th-century French Jesuits
17th-century French historians